Lithopolia is a moth genus in the family Noctuidae. It contains only one species, Lithopolia confusa, which is found in Taiwan.

References
Natural History Museum Lepidoptera genus database
Lithopolia at funet

Orthosiini
Monotypic moth genera
Moths of Asia